Alexander the Great (July 356 BC – June 323 BC), a king of ancient Macedon, created one of the largest empires in history by waging an extensive military campaign throughout Asia. Alexander was groomed for rulership from an early age and acceeded to the throne after the assassination of his father, Philip II. After subduing rebellious vassals, he invaded the Persian Achaemenid Empire in 334 BC. Alexander swiftly conquered large areas of Western Asia and Egypt before defeating the Persian king Darius III in battle at Issus and Gaugamela. Achieving complete domination over the former lands of the Achaemenids by 327 BC, Alexander attempted to conquer India but turned back after his weary troops mutinied. Following his death aged thirty-two in Babylon in 323 BC, his empire disintegrated in a series of civil wars fought between his former followers.

Alexander founded numerous settlements during his campaigns, naming them after himself or close followers. These have been the subject of intense debate, as the accounts of ancient and medieval scholars differ wildly and are often contradictory. Plutarch provides the maximum estimate of seventy cities in his Life of Alexander, but most texts attest to between ten and twenty foundations. The Greek Alexander Romance lists between nine and thirteen cities, depending on the recension; the Syriac, Armenian, Hebrew, and Ethiopic versions of the Romance also record twelve or thirteen foundations. Persian sources such as al-Tabari, al-Dinawari, Hamza al-Isfahani, and Qudama ascribe between nine and twelve settlements to Alexander. Stephanus of Byzantium recorded around twenty settlements. Some authors additionally document the number of cities established in a specific area: for example, Strabo records that Alexander founded eight cities in Bactria. The accounts of Alexander's campaigns, primarily those of Arrian, Plutarch, Diodorus, Curtius Rufus, and Justin, provide supplementary evidence. Finally, the geographers Erastothenes, Ptolemy, and Pliny draw upon the otherwise-lost evidence of Alexander's bematist distance-measurers.

When attempting to decipher the above sources, modern scholars face numerous problems. Classical writers tended to name every settlement πόλις ("city"), from large population centres to small military garrisons; this leads to much confusion, especially considering the possibility that a settlement started out as a military colony and only later grew into a true πόλις. Although it is often said that Alexander named all his foundations after himself, this is incorrect; nonetheless, the abundance of these settlements led to many taking on epithets such as Eschate or Oxeiana. As some settlements may have taken on multiple such sobriquets, it is likely that "different authors, undoubtedly reflecting different local traditions, might have been referring to the same Alexandreia by different epithets", in the words of the historian Getzel Cohen. In addition, the precise locations of many foundations are unknown. The classicist William Woodthorpe Tarn noted on the matter that "the difficulties of the subject are considerable, the margin of uncertainty often substantial, the sources of confusion numerous".

Possible foundations
This list contains settlements established or re-established on the order of Alexander the Great himself, often in his presence and always before his death in 323 BC. It does not include any posthumous foundations or refoundations; nor does it include settlements which only claimed a relationship to the Macedonian king. A discussion of these settlements is found below.

Settlements whose very existence has been questioned are marked as Uncertain; those which are known to exist but for which scholars disagree on foundation theories are marked as Disputed; and the settlements which are both known to exist and which are acknowledged by scholars as foundations of Alexander are marked as Accepted.

Other settlements

Europe
While Philip II was besieging Perinthus, Alexander, as regent, subdued the Maedi, a Thracian tribe, in what is now southwestern Bulgaria. According to Plutarch, he founded a small settlement in the region and named it Alexandropolis; the name mirrored his father's foundation of Philippopolis and was probably given on Philip's order. The settlement's site is unknown, and some scholars have found its historicity questionable.

Asia Minor

Many ancient settlements claimed a significant relationship to Alexander. In Asia Minor, such cities included Ilion, Priene, and Smyrna. In 334 BC, Alexander visited Ilion, site of the ruined Troy. He ordered that the town be made exempt from taxes and its buildings be rebuilt; he later promised to make Ilion a great city. However, none of these plans came to fruition in Alexander's lifetime. A local tribe called the Alexandris were probably named after the legendary Paris, sometimes called Alexander, not the Macedonian king. Although Alexander certainly took a great interest in Priene (including dedicating the city's temple to Athena and granting exemptions to the populace), and even though it is probable that the town was refounded in the late fourth century, there is no direct evidence to claim Alexander carried it out. Excavations of the site could not find pre-Hellenistic remains. While the later authors Pausanias, Pliny, and Aelius Aristides recorded traditions which held that Alexander refounded Smyrna, Strabo, writing in the first century BC, instead noted that the settlement was revived by Antigonus I Monophthalmus after Alexander's death. Other settlements in the region, with much less viable claims, include Aegae, Alexandria by the Latmos, Amorium, Apollonia, Chrysopolis, Eukarpia,  Kretopolis, Nicaea, and Otrus.

Egypt, Phoenicia, and Syria
In Syria, the city of Antioch, later to become one of the major cities of the ancient world, claimed a relationship with Alexander. According to Libanius, a 4th-century AD native of the city, Alexander planned to found a city on the future site of Antioch but did not have enough time to do so; he instead set up a shrine to Zeus and a small fortress. It is likely that this tradition was merely a local legend. The nearby settlement of Alexandria by Issus, located in the general area of modern İskenderun, is only recorded as a foundation of Alexander by Pseudo-Scymnus, and some recensions of the Alexander Romance; a seal found nearby bears the king's portrait. Considering the emphasis on Alexandria in Egypt as his first foundation, it is considered very unlikely that Alexander founded the settlement, although it almost certainly existed. In Phoenicia and Egypt, the cities of Gaza and Tyre are sometimes recorded as refoundations of Alexander. Tyre was besieged and destroyed in 332 BC, and Gaza experienced a similar fate later in the same year. Although Alexander rebuilt and resettled both cities, they are not usually considered foundations, but rather large-scale rehabilitations. Other less well-supported claims include that of Alexandroschene, Capitolias, Dion, Larisa Sizara, Nikopolis, Paraitonion, Pella, and Seleucia Abila.

The eastern provinces

In Mesopotamia, Nikephorion (present-day Raqqa) was occasionally attributed to Alexander, but it was more probably founded by Seleucus I. The 19th-century Orientalist H. C. Rawlinson proposed that the Macedonian king founded a settlement shortly after and near the Battle of Gaugamela in Assyria. There are numerous attestations that Alexander founded a city in Lower Mesopotamia: many city-names such as Seleucia-on-the-Hedyphon, Alexandria near Babylon, Alexandria near the Pallakopas, and Alexandria on the Tigris have been proposed; but it is likely that some of these names refer to the same city. Alexandria Carmania may have been founded in Carmania, but its existence is only weakly supported; if it existed, it was likely a later foundation. Similarly, the Altars of Alexander and the Portus Macedonum, reputedly located near Carmania, may have been elephant-hunting stations established by Nearchus. A settlement named Alexandropolis was supposedly founded near Nysa, but there is no evidence to support a foundation so soon after the army's passage of the Caspian Gates.

Further east, Alexandria in Sakastane was likely founded after Alexander's death and only then attributed to him. Many Alexandrias are attested to regions of Bactria, Sogdiana, and the Indian subcontinent; however, most are considered to be different names for the same settlement. Thus, Alexandria Opiane and Alexandria Kapisa are considered to be names for Alexandria in the Caucasus; Alexandria near Baktra and Alexandria Oxiana may both refer to the same problematic settlement; while in India, the settlements of Taxila and Patala probably existed, but Alexander likely founded neither. Quintus Curtius Rufus wrote that Alexander founded several cities in the Indus Delta, but these were probably only garrisons.

References

Sources

 
 
 
 
 
 
 
 
 
 

 
Lists of cities
City founding